Centre of Behavioural and Cognitive Sciences (also known as CBCS) is an independent research center of University of Allahabad, Uttar Pradesh. It was created in 2002 as a ‘Centre with Potential for Excellence’ by University Grants Commission (India) (UGC).

History 
CBCS was formally inaugurated on 2 February 2003 by the then Minister of Human Resource Development, Government of India.

Laboratories and other facilities 
The institute has several labs to facilitate researchers to study the mind and brain. The institute has its own library and computer lab. It has multiple seminar halls and is well equipped with high end computers to run behavioral experiments.

The Centre has electroencephalograph (EEG), transcranial magnetic stimulation (TMS) machine and a Functional magnetic resonance imaging (fMRI) machine to study the neurophysiological aspect of the human mind. The Centre also has eye trackers to study the cognitive processes like perception, attention, memory and language.

Cognitive Neuroscience Lab
Neuroinformatic & Intelligent Computing Lab
Visual Cognition Lab
Psycholinguistics Lab
Biofeedback Lab
Virtual Reality Lab
Neuropsychology Lab
Neuroimaging and fMRI Lab

Research 
Main research areas are:
 Perception
 Attention 
 Consciousness
 Affect & Cognition
 Decision Making
 Bilingualism
 Cognitive Disorders
 Learning & Memory
 Actions
 Psycholinguistics
 Computational Modeling

Training 
The center offers post-graduate degree (M.Sc.), M.Sc. + PhD integrated with different exit options and doctoral (D.Phil.) training in Cognitive Sciences. These programs aim to develop a solid foundation in the basic areas of cognitive science in an inter-disciplinary manner and to train the students to perform research using multiple methodologies.

Extra-curricular activities 
The Centre organizes various activities such as the neuroscience quiz contest - regional brain bee  in collaboration with the International Brain Bee for Grade 11 students from CBSE and ISC schools. The brain bee competition consists of a written test, followed by an oral round with increasing level of difficulty. The winner of 2023 Regional Brain Bee from Prayagraj will appear for the National Brain Bee at Delhi. It is an initiative to encourage neuroscience education.

References 

University of Allahabad
2002 establishments in Uttar Pradesh
Educational institutions established in 2002